Louise Stephenson (born 9 July 1995) is an Australian rules footballer playing for the Hawthorn Football Club in the AFL Women's competition. Stephenson was recruited by Greater Western Sydney as a priority player in September 2016. She made her debut in the five point win against  at Blacktown ISP Oval in round five of the 2017 season. She played three matches in her debut season.

Statistics 
Updated to the end of S7 (2022)

|-
| 2017 ||  || 12
| 3 || 0 || 0 || 10 || 6 || 16 || 4 || 1 || 0.0 || 0.0 || 3.3 || 2.0 || 5.3 || 1.3 || 0.3 || 2
|-
| 2018 ||  || 12
| 2 || 0 || 0 || 5 || 1 || 6 || 1 || 3 || 0.0 || 0.0 || 2.5 || 0.5 || 3.0 || 0.5 || 1.5 || 0
|-
| 2019 ||  || 12
| 7 || 1 || 0 || 30 || 37 || 67 || 10 || 13 || 0.1 || 0.0 || 4.3 || 5.3 || 9.6 || 1.4 || 1.9 || 0
|-
| 2020 ||  || 12
| 7 || 0 || 0 || 37 || 23 || 60 || 8 || 15 || 0.0 || 0.0 || 5.3 || 3.3 || 8.6 || 1.1 || 2.1 || 0
|-
| 2021 ||  || 12
| 7 || 0 || 0 || 45 || 17 || 62 || 15 || 14 || 0.0 || 0.0 || 6.4 || 2.4 || 8.9 || 2.1 || 2.0 || 0
|-
| 2022 ||  || 12
| 7 || 3 || 0 || 33 || 19 || 52 || 15 || 17 || 0.4 || 0.0 || 4.7 || 2.7 || 7.4 || 2.1 || 2.4 || 0
|-
| S7 (2022) ||  || 12
| 3 || 0 || 0 || 7 || 13 || 20 || 3 || 10 || 0.0 || 0.0 || 2.3 || 4.3 || 6.7 || 1.0 || 3.3 || 0
|- class="sortbottom"
! colspan=3| Career
! 36 !! 4 !! 0 !! 167 !! 116 !! 283 !! 56 !! 73 !! 0.1 !! 0.0 !! 4.6 !! 3.2 !! 7.9 !! 1.6 !! 2.0 !! 2
|}

References

External links 

1995 births
Living people
Greater Western Sydney Giants (AFLW) players
Australian rules footballers from Victoria (Australia)
Melbourne University Football Club (VFLW) players